Adam Stewart (born January 27, 1981) is a Jamaican businessman. He is the Executive Chairman of the Caribbean-based resort company Sandals Resorts International (SRI), and President of the Sandals Foundation, the philanthropic arm of Sandals Resorts International. He is also chairman of the ATL Group, a Jamaica-based automotive, commercial, and domestic appliance distributor.

Early life

Stewart was born on January 27, 1981, in Kingston, Jamaica, the same year that his father, Gordon "Butch" Stewart purchased his first hotel and launched the Sandals Resorts chain.

Stewart was raised in Jamaica and graduated from Florida International University’s Hospitality Management Program in Miami, Florida.

Sandals Resort International

During his tenure as chief executive officer, SRI has witnessed the launch of Grand Pineapple Beach Resorts in Jamaica and Antigua in 2008, the addition of the Italian and Key West Villages at the company's flagship Beaches Turks & Caicos Resort Villages & Spa, and the launch of Sandals Emerald Bay in the Bahamas, a 245-room resort with a 150-slip marina and Greg Norman golf course, in February 2010.

In November 2013, SRI opened their first resort in Barbados, Sandals Barbados, as well as announcing plans to build a Beaches Resort in the island in 2014.

In December 2013, the company's opened their first resort in Grenada, Sandals LaSource Grenada.

In August 2016, Stewart was conferred upon the Order of Distinction (Commander Class) for outstanding service to tourism and the hotel sector.

In January 2021, Stewart became chairman of SRI upon the death of his father, Gordon "Butch" Stewart.

Island Routes Adventure Tours

In 2011, Stewart launched Island Routes Adventure Tours, offering excursions throughout the region.
Island Routes has since grown from a small island outpost to a multiple World Travel Award-winning company of 200 people offering hundreds of adventures in 12 islands with the enviable title of the Caribbean's leading Tour Company in just three years.

The ATL Group

In August 2009, Adam Stewart was appointed as CEO and Deputy Chairman of the family-owned ATL Group comprising the Jamaica Observer, and ATL Appliance Traders, a chain of domestic and commercial appliance outlets combining distributorship of electronic brands in Jamaica.

In 2010, Stewart launched ATL Automotive. ATL Automotive incorporates sales and service centres located in Kingston and Montego Bay offering sales and service of Audi, Volkswagen, Honda, Jaguar, Land Rover and Range Rover automobiles.

In April 2015, ATL Automotive announced the termination of its Jaguar and Land Rover distributorship in order to focus on new brands that would better complement the company's growth strategy.

In January 2016, ATL Automotive signed an agreement to become Regional Master Dealers for BMW and MINI in Jamaica and eight countries throughout the Caribbean. The regional appointment, a first ever for a Jamaican automotive company, followed a nine-month tender process that saw ATL Automotive overcome international bids from across Europeans and the Americas.

In March 2016, the ATL Automotive Group announced an exclusive partnership to bring German carmaker Porsche to Jamaica.

Caribbean Coffee Traders Limited (CCTL)

On May 4, 2017, it was announced that Starbucks had entered into a licensing agreement with Caribbean Coffee Traders Limited (CCTL), for it to own and operate Starbucks stores in Jamaica. Caribbean Coffee Traders Limited (CCTL) is a joint venture between Ian Dear, Chief Executive Officer of Margaritaville Caribbean Group area franchise of Jimmy Buffett's Margaritaville and Adam Stewart.

Starbucks opened its first store on the island in Montego Bay, St James on November 21, 2017. The company as well as local license Caribbean Coffee Baristas Limited (CCB) have plans to roll out a further 14 stores in Jamaica by 2020.

Awards

•	In 2010, Stewart was awarded Caribbean World's Travel and Tourism Personality of the Year

•	In 2010, Stewart was awarded the Distinguished Alumni Torch Award from FIU

•	In 2012, Stewart was awarded The Gleaners Jamaica 50 Under 50 Award

•	In 2012, Stewart was awarded the World Travel Awards Rising Star

•	In June 2015, Stewart was named Hotelier of the Year 2014/2015 by the Jamaica Hotel and Tourism Association

•	On October 4, 2015, Stewart was named the Caribbean Hotel and Tourism Associations Hotelier of the Year 2015. 

•	On October 16, 2015, Stewart was named the Caribbean Personality of the Year 2015 at the Caribbean World Travel & Living Awards 

•	In August 2016, Stewart was appointed as a member of the Order of Distinction (Commander Class) for outstanding service to tourism and the hotel sector.

ATL Racing

In 2011, Stewart launched the ATL Racing Team in partnership with leading Jamaican racing car driver, Doug ‘Hollywood’ Gore, with a custom-built Audi TT.

The Sandals Foundation and Philanthropy

In 2009, Stewart founded the Sandals Foundation.

In 2012, Stewart also founded and currently sits as Chairman of the We Care Foundation, a local non-profit organisation that brings together Montego Bay-based individuals to raise funds and improve the facilities of the nearby Cornwall Regional Hospital.
In 2012, Stewart established an internationally accredited private sector educational institute, Sandals Corporate University, which promotes distance learning in the Caribbean.

In 2013, Sandals Foundation provided a US$50,000 donation to the Caribbean-SickKids Paediatric Cancer and Blood Disorders project with the objective of improving outcomes for children affected by cancers and serious blood disorders in the Caribbean. Additionally, Adam Stewart was named ambassador of the project.

References 

1981 births
Living people
Jamaican chief executives
Florida International University alumni
People from Montego Bay
People from Kingston, Jamaica
21st-century businesspeople